The Indian Air Force has been undergoing a modernization program to replace and upgrade outdated equipment since the late 1990s to meet modern standards. For that reason, it has started procuring and developing aircraft, weapons, associated technologies, and infrastructures. Some of these programs date back to the late 1980s. The primary focus of current modernization and upgrades is to replace aircraft purchased from the Soviet Union that currently form the backbone of the Air Force.

The Indian Airforce plans to attain a 42 squadron strength by 2035 and deploy 450 fighter jets each along the borders of Pakistan and China. The IAF will also acquire large numbers of stealthy autonomous UCAVs (DRDO AURA), swarm drones (ALFA-S) and uncrewed aircraft to transform into a fully advanced Network-Centric Force capable of sustained multi-role operations along the entire spectrum.

Upgrades

 Super Sukhoi

According to the report, the ‘Super Sukhoi’ upgrade for the IAF's fleet of Su-30MKIs is in advanced levels of discussions, with modernisation plans for avionics, engines and weaponry on offer. The IAF, Hindustan Aeronautics Limited (HAL) and the Russian government have been working on the upgrade programme. The HAL Chief R Madhavan reportedly confirmed that technical proposals regarding the programme have been discussed as recently as last month.

"The configuration has not yet been finalized but the upgrade basically will include beyond visual range capability, new electronic warfare suites, an engine upgrade as well as a new radar," Madhavan said.

The current N011M Bars radar of the Su-30 MKI has a radar capable of searching objects to a range of 400 km and tracking them within 200 km of the range, however, the current radar is not an active electronically scanned array (AESA) Radar so it can be jammed but Super Sukhoi will have a modern AESA radar and top contender for that is X-BAND N036 Byelka AESA radar. It is the same radar used in Russian 5th generation fighter Su-57.

EW Capabilities of Sukhoi-30MKI would be enhanced by Indigenous DARE's High Band Jammer Pod (HBT), Dhruti Radar Warning System, and a Dual Color Missile Approach Warning System.

Under procurement

Fighter aircraft

  HAL Tejas Mark 1/Mark 1A
HAL has already received orders for 40 aircraft of Mark 1 variant which will be delivered by 2022. On 3 February 2021, the Ministry of Defense signed the contract with HAL for the procurement of 83 advanced Tejas which includes 73 Mark 1A and 10 Mark 1 trainer variants with advanced AESA Radar, jammers, superior avionics, next-gen BVR missiles, better payload, and enhanced combat range. The induction of 123 Tejas Mark 1/Mark 1A will be completed by 2028.

 Dassault Rafale

On 10 April 2015, during Prime Minister Narendra Modi's visit to Paris, it was announced that India would buy 36 Dassault Rafales in fly-away condition by 2030. The deal stalled for a considerable amount of time due to price negotiations, but was finalised in November 2015.

On 23 September 2016, India's Defence Minister Manohar Parrikar and his French counterpart Jean-Yves Le Drian signed the contract for the purchase of 36 Rafales in a deal worth 7.8 billion Euros. The first Rafale warplanes were slated to be delivered roughly within three years of the signing of the deal. The first aircraft was delivered to the IAF in 2019, with the full complement of aircraft to be delivered by end of 2021 and five new Rafale aircraft reached India in July 2020. A second batch of three Rafale jets arrived at Jamnagar airbase in Gujarat on 4 November 2020 after flying non-stop from France. India has also made a deal with France to buy Hammer missiles to use with Rafale.

MMRCA 2.0
On 3 January 2017, Minister of Defence Manohar Parrikar addressed a media conference and announced plans for a competition to select a strategic partner to deliver "200 new single-engine fighters to be made in India, which will easily cost around (USD) $45 million apiece without weaponry" with an expectation that Lockheed Martin (USA) and Saab (Sweden) will pitch the F-16 Block 70 and Gripen, respectively.

An MoD official said that a global tender will be put to market in the first quarter of 2018, with a private company nominated as the strategic partner's production agency followed by a two or more year process to evaluate technical and financial bids and conduct trials, before the final government-to-government deal in 2021. This represents 11 squadrons of aircraft plus several 'attrition' aircraft.

However, the plan to acquire foreign-made single-engine fighters was replaced by induction indigenous aircraft Tejas of different variants.

Later the competition was declared to be exclusively open for twin-engine fighters of Rafale category.
The contenders are Rafale, Eurofighter Typhoon, Mig 35, Boeing F/A-18E/F Super Hornet, Sukhoi Su-35, Boeing F-15EX, Saab JAS 39 Gripen E/F and Lockheed Martin F-21 (variant of F-16). NB Gripen and F-21 are single-engined.

Strategic bombers 

In 2022, retired Air Chief Marshal Arup Raha revealed that India was interested in purchasing Tupolev Tu-160 bombers from Russia. Reports emerged that India was in talks with Russia to acquire six Tu-160 Blackjack bombers that will make India only country other than US, Russia and China to have operational strategic bombers.

Transports
 Airbus C295
Airbus Defence and Space and Tata Advanced Systems Limited (TASL) will jointly execute the project to equip the air force with 56 C-295 transport aircraft under the Make in India initiative in the aerospace sector. Under the contract, Airbus will supply the first 16 aircraft in flyaway condition while the remaining 40 will be assembled in India by TASL, the officials said. The procurement of 56 C-295 from Airbus with the participation of an Indian production agency for the manufacture of 40 aircraft (out of a total of 56) in India is at the financial approval stage and the contract is likely to be signed in the near future, the defence ministry said in its year-end review. While the C-295s are meant to replace the Avro-748 transport planes, the new aircraft will also be suitable for the demanding roles that the An-32 currently undertakes. The first 16 planes will be supplied in two years, and the deliveries of the 40 locally assembled ones will be spread over an additional eight years. The aircraft can operate from short, unprepared airstrips and carry out a variety of missions in all-weather conditions.

Helicopters

HAL Prachand
The IAF will deploy indigenously developed HAL Prachand for its combat operations, complementing AH-64D Apache, after the Operational certificate is granted. Limited Series Production of 15 Prachand started in 2017 (5 for Army, 10 for Air Force). The Indian Air Force has placed an order for 65 Prachand. The type is also intended to be sold on the export market.
HAL Rudra
The Hindustan Aeronautics Limited is now developing the HAL Dhruv Weapon System Integrated (WSI) helicopter named HAL Rudra. It is a variant of Dhruv (ALH) MK-4 to strengthen the fleet of attack helicopters. Indian Air Force placed an order for 38 Rudra helicopters.
Mi-17V-5
In July 2018, the Indian Air Force was looking to place an additional order of 48 Mi-17V5 aircraft. Some older Mi-17s are due for engine overhauls. In April 2022, the Indian Air Force decided to cancel plans to buy 48 more Mi-17 V5 helicopters from Russia.

HAL Dhruv
IAF operates the indigenously developed Advance Light Helicopter HAL Dhruv for various purposes including the transportation of troops and logistics, as well as limited search and rescue operations. 46 have been delivered to IAF, with 65(+) on order with HAL.

Kamov Ka-226T
In December 2014, Kamov Ka-226T was selected as a Light Utility Helicopter and an initial replacement for Chetak & Cheetah, while the LUH was under development. Kamov would set up a production plant in India and around 197 would be procured under the "Make in India" programme. The agreement on manufacture of Kamov 226 helicopter in India is the first project for a major defence platform under the Make In India mission.
 HAL Light Utility Helicopter
In March 2021, the Ministry of Defence placed an initial order of six light utility helicopters for the Indian Airforce. The deliveries are expected to commence from August 2022.

Uncrewed aerial vehicles
The Indian Air Force has submitted a request for information to international suppliers for an uncrewed combat air vehicle (UCAV) with a low-radar cross-section, high service ceiling, an expected range of 500 nm (925 km) and the capability to carry precision-guided weapons in an internal weapons bay.

Trainers
 HAL HTT-40
The IAF was planning to acquire 181 basic trainer aircraft & IAF selected Switzerland's Pilatus Aircraft to supply 75 PC-7 Mk.II trainer planes for $1 billion. The Indian Ministry of Defence wanted to buy an additional 106 basic trainer aircraft from Pilatus in a separate deal. However, on 28 February 2015, it was reported that Ministry of Defence has selected 70 HAL HTT-40 trainers and 38 Pilatus trainers to replace its current trainer aircraft fleet stating that this move was "commercially viable" under the "Make in India" programme. In 2017, HAL CMD reported that HAL will soon sign a contract for 106 HTT-40 aircraft and deliver it to the air force.

In May 2020, Chief of the Air Staff ACM Rakesh Kumar Singh Bhadauria announced the plan to shelve the order for additional Pilatus PC-7 for the indigenous HAL HTT-40.

Cruise missiles

DRDO has developed the air-launched version of the BrahMos cruise missile in a joint venture with Russia's NPO Mashinostroeyenia. The air-launched version for the Indian Air Force is ready for testing. The IAF has signed a contract with Russia to upgrade 40 Su-30MKIs to give them the capability of carrying the BrahMos cruise missile by 2012.

DRDO has also developed the nuclear-capable Nirbhay cruise missile, which is capable of hitting targets at 1000 km to 1500 km at 2 m accuracy.

Hypersonic cruise missile

BrahMos-II or BrahMos-2 or BrahMos Mark II is a hypersonic cruise missile currently under joint development by India's Defence Research and Development Organisation and Russia's NPO Mashinostroyenia, which have together formed BrahMos Aerospace Private Limited. It is the second of the BrahMos series of cruise missiles. The BrahMos-II is expected to have a range of 1,000 kilometres (620 mi; 540 nmi) and a speed of Mach 8. During the cruise stage of flight, the missile will be propelled by a scramjet airbreathing jet engine. Other details, including production cost and physical dimensions of the missile, are yet to be published. The planned operational range of the BrahMos-II had initially been restricted to 290 kilometres as Russia is a signatory to the Missile Technology Control Regime (MTCR), which prohibits it from helping other countries develop missiles with ranges above 300 kilometres (190 mi; 160 nmi). However, subsequent to India becoming an MTCR signatory in 2014, the parameters for Brahmos 2 will get enhanced. Its top speed will be double that of the current BrahMos-I, and it has been described as the fastest cruise missile in the world. Testing was planned to start in 2020 but has been delayed.

Surface-to-air missile systems
India and Israel have agreed to expand their missile development cooperation with a longer-range version of their extended-range Barak 8 air defense system for the Indian Air Force.

Under development

Fighters

Advanced Medium Combat Aircraft  (AMCA)
 

ADA has completed design work on an Advanced Medium Combat Aircraft (AMCA), which is a twin-engined 5.5 generation stealth multirole fighter with the capability to fly uncrewed. It will complement the HAL Tejas, the Sukhoi Su-30MKI, MWF and the Dassault Rafale in the Indian Air Force. The main purpose of this aircraft is to give IAF a technological edge. The first flight is expected to be by 2025 and serial production might begin by 2030.

Omni-role Combat Aircraft (ORCA)

Omni Role Combat Aircraft is a concept to design & develop a twin-engine omni role fighter of Rafale category. The design of the Omni Role Combat Aircraft (ORCA), an Air Force variant of the Twin Engine Deck Based Fighter (TEDBF), with significant design differences, was being studied as of 2020. The first flight is expected in 2026 with induction into the forces by 2032.

Medium Weight Fighter (MWF/ Tejas MK2)

The HAL Tejas Mark 2, or Medium Weight Fighter or HAL MWF, is a planned single-engine, delta wing, multirole fighter designed by the Aeronautical Development Agency (ADA) and Hindustan Aeronautics Limited (HAL) for the Indian Air Force (IAF). It is a further development of the HAL Tejas, or Light Combat Aircraft (LCA), programme which began in the 1980s to replace India's ageing MiG-21 fighters. The Tejas Mk 2 is being designed to replace multiple strike-fighters like SEPECAT Jaguars, Dassault Mirage-2000 & MiG-29 of Indian Air Force.

It has a tail-less compound delta-wing configuration with a single vertical stabilizer with closed-coupled canards to provide static instability and high manoeuvrability, and is equipped with fly-by-wire systems to control instability.

There is confirmation from the chief of the Aeronautical Development Agency that MWF will shed its "Tejas" stamp and get a completely new name altogether during or after its first flight. Metal cutting for the prototypes began in January 2021. The first prototype is expected to be rolled out by December 2023 with first flight by December 2024. A total of four prototypes are initially planned.

Uncrewed wingman

The HAL Combat Air Teaming System is a planned uncrewed and crewed combat aircraft air teaming system being developed by Hindustan Aeronautics Limited. The system will consist of a crewed fighter aircraft acting as "mothership" of the system and a set of swarming UAVs and UCAVs governed by the main aircraft. A twin-seated HAL Tejas is likely to be the main fighter aircraft.

HAL CATS Warrior part of HAL Combat Air Teaming System is an armed stealth drone which will team up and fight alongside IAF fighters to hit high-value enemy targets. It is designed to carry out MUM-T Operations. It will be the first line of offense in operations against heavily defended, integrated air defence networks. An Indian defence startup is also a part of the mission team.

Each drone will initially be armed with a single precision-guided weapon, such as an air-to-surface missile or a laser-guided bomb. Future versions of the platform will also be able to fire air-to-air missiles to target enemy fighters. The Uncrewed Wingman will be connected to a heavily upgraded IAF Jaguar fighter bomber (called the Jaguar Max); pilots onboard will assign specific tasks to each of the uncrewed drones which fly alongside the fighter. The drone will also operate with other platforms. The first flight is expected by 2022 & induction by 2029.

HAL is designing & developing AI-powered, stealthy autonomous swarm drones known as ALFA-S in collaboration with a private firm in Bangalore. R&D work will be completed in 2 years & first flight is expected by 2022.
The ALFA-S swarming drones will have two folding wings. They will be fitted inside canisters mounted under the wings of IAF aircraft.
Each swarm could have dozens of individual drones. If detected, some of the drones would be shot down, but the sheer numbers of the swarm would overwhelm enemy defences such as surface-to-air missile units to ensure a high probability of mission success. The first drone prototypes are likely to be deployed from Hawk Advanced Jet Trainers being built, under licence, at Hindustan Aeronautics. Ultimately though, the drones are meant to be launched from any Indian Air Force aircraft - fighter jets and transports.

The plan to develop indigenous swarming drones is a part of the Combat Air Teaming System project or CATS, which has three distinct elements. In addition to the ALFA-S swarm drones, a robotic wingman, meant to accompany a crewed fighter jet into combat is being also being developed.

The final element of CATS is the development of an ultra-high altitude drone meant to remain flying for up to three weeks at a stretch while providing real-time images and video.

The government strongly backs the Combat Air Teaming System initiative as part of the Make in India programme, which encourages Indian defence manufacturers to focus on core research and development projects towards the next-generation requirements of India's armed forces. In 2018, the Defence Ministry set up iDEX, or Innovations for Defence Excellence under the Defence Innovation Organisation, a not-for-profit company meant to provide high-level policy guidance for high-tech indigenous ventures working on India's defence and aerospace needs.

Transports

The IAF had also placed an order for 15 NAL Saras light transport aircraft designed by the National Aerospace Laboratories (NAL). The manufacturer has stated that the Indian Air Force intended to place an order for up to 45 aircraft. National Aeronautics Limited (NAL) has stopped all work on NAL Saras as the funding for the project stopped by end of 2013 due to cost overruns and inability to reduce the weight of the aircraft. The development of the Saras was restarted by the National Aeronautics Laboratories in February 2017.

Trainers

HAL HJT-36
HAL has developed the HAL HJT-36 Sitara intermediate jet trainer aircraft for the IAF which carried out its maiden test flight in 2003. These aircraft are scheduled to replace the aging HJT-16 Kiran mk.I. The Indian Air Force has placed an order for 73 aircraft, of which the first 12 are in production. The order by the Indian Air Force could eventually grow to 250 aircraft. Two prototype aircraft have been built. These aircraft have undergone 280 test flights.

Helicopters

Indian Multi Role Helicopter (IMRH) 
The HAL Medium Lift Helicopter (MLH) is a planned large rotorcraft in the 10–15 ton class. The company is currently seeking out foreign partners either from Russia or Europe's Airbus Helicopters, with which the company has ambitions of developing the MLH and producing around 350 medium-lift helicopters. The three branches of the Indian armed forces are envisioned to be major customers for the type. According to HAL, the MLH is to be in the same class as the Russian Mil Mi 17.

Uncrewed aerial vehicles
The DRDO of India is developing a Medium Altitude Long Endurance Uncrewed Aerial Vehicle (UAV) called the Rustom (English: Warrior) for all three branches of the Indian Armed Forces. The Rustom will replace/supplement the Heron UAVs in service with the Indian armed forces.

DRDO is also developing the GHATAK which is an Uncrewed Combat Air Vehicle (UCAV) for the Indian Air Force. The design work on the UCAV is carried out by Aeronautical Development Agency (ADA). The AURA UCAV will be a tactical stealth aircraft built largely with composites, and capable of delivering laser-guided strike weapons. It would be a stealthy flying-wing concept aircraft with internal weapons and a turbofan engine.

Surface-to-air missile systems
DRDO has nearly finished the developmental trail of the New Generation missile of Akash SAM known as Akash-NG. Akash-NG is developed to provide a cheap alternative for the Barak 8. It will have the same range of 70 km with all-weather and all-terrain capability. The missile will be able to neutralise and destroy fighter aircraft, cruise missiles and air-to-surface missiles as well as ballistic missiles. It will use Ku-band Active radar seeker. The missile is expected to come into service in 2022 and will be produced by Bharat Dynamics Limited (BDL) and Bharat Electronics (BEL).

DRDO is also working on XRSAM long-range surface-to-air missile defence system. It will be used to bridge the gap between MR-SAM (100 km) and S-400 (400 km) Air Defence System and will be using spin-off technologies developed for country's Anti-Ballistic missile Defence system. The missile system will have a range of 250 km against fighter jets, 350 km against cruise missiles, sea skimming anti-ship missiles, AWACS and mid-air refuelers and will be capable of bringing down ballistic missiles and stealth fighters in the terminal stage.

Astronauts 

Gaganyaan (Sanskrit; IAST: gagan-yāna) transl. "Sky Craft") is an Indian crewed orbital spacecraft intended to be the formative spacecraft of the Indian Human Spaceflight Programme. The spacecraft is being designed to carry three people, and a planned upgraded version will be equipped with rendezvous and docking capability.

In its maiden crewed mission, the Indian Space Research Organisation (ISRO)'s largely autonomous 3.7-tonne (8,200 lb) capsule will orbit the Earth at 400 km (250 mi) altitude for up to seven days with a two or three-person crew on board. The crewed vehicle is planned to be launched on ISRO's GSLV Mk III in December 2021. This Hindustan Aeronautics Limited (HAL) manufactured crew module had its first un-crewed experimental flight on 18 December 2014.

As of May 2019, the design of the crew module has been completed. Defence Research and Development Organisation (DRDO) will provide support for critical human-centric systems and technologies like space grade food, crew healthcare, radiation measurement and protection, parachutes for the safe recovery of the crew module and fire suppression system.

On 11 June 2020, it was announced that the overall timeline for the Gaganyaan launches had been revised due to a change in launch priorities and COVID-19.

See also 
 List of active Indian military aircraft
 Future of the Indian Navy
 List of equipment of the Indian Army
 List of ships of the Indian Navy
List of active Indian Navy ships

References

Indian Air Force
Military planning